George Alfred Parago (August 20, 1861 – September 25, 1950) was an American Negro league outfielder in the 1880s.

A native of Charlottesville, Virginia, Parago played for the Cuban Giants between 1886 and 1888.
 He died in Trenton, New Jersey in 1950 at age 89.

References

External links
Negro league baseball statistics and player information from Seamheads

1861 births
1950 deaths
Cuban Giants players
Baseball outfielders
Baseball players from Virginia
Sportspeople from Charlottesville, Virginia
20th-century African-American people